Derek George Stanbridge Neate (1 October 1927 – October 2014) was an English professional footballer who played as a winger in the Football League for Brighton & Hove Albion.

Life and career
Neate was born in 1927 in Uxbridge, Middlesex. He began playing football as an amateur for Hayes in 1947. A winger known for his pace, Neate was under consideration to represent Great Britain at the 1948 London Olympics as a sprinter, but an appearance in the Powderhall Sprint, a race with a cash prize, had deprived him of his amateur status and therefore his eligibility. He continued as a regular in the Hayes team until a broken leg suffered in May 1952 deprived him not only of a whole season's football but also of possible selection for the Great Britain football team at the 1952 Olympics. He gained weight and lost confidence while out injured, and found it difficult to re-establish himself in the side. He then suffered burst blood vessels in a leg and other health issues, and was advised to retire, but by late 1955 his form and fitness had returned.

Towards the end of the 1955–56 season, Neate turned professional with Brighton & Hove Albion. He made his debut in a 1–1 draw with promotion rivals Leyton Orient, a match that Albion needed to win, and by the end of the following season had made 28 appearances in the Third Division South and scored six goals. He stayed with the club for a further two years, but Denis Foreman and Frankie Howard kept him out of the first team. He settled in Lancing, West Sussex, and spent three years as player-manager of County League club Bognor Regis Town, and also managed Southwick, Worthing and Steyning Town, before retiring from the game.

Neate died in West Sussex in 2014 at the age of 87.

References

1927 births
2014 deaths
Footballers from Uxbridge
English footballers
Association football wingers
Hayes F.C. players
Brighton & Hove Albion F.C. players
Bognor Regis Town F.C. players
English Football League players
English football managers
Bognor Regis Town F.C. managers
Southwick F.C. managers
People from Lancing, West Sussex